Michael Micevski (born 9 October 1954) is an Australian former soccer player as a forward.

Club career
During the 1970s Micevski played for Altona Gate and Melbourne Hakoah before moving to Sydney to play for Marconi. In 1976, he had a brief stint with Arminia Bielefeld.

International career
Micevski made one appearance for Australia in 1975 against China.

References

Living people
1954 births
Australian soccer players
Association football forwards
Australia international soccer players
Marconi Stallions FC players